Fritz Schäfer (7 September 1912 in Pirmasens – 15 October 1973 in Ludwigshafen am Rhein) was a German wrestler who competed in the 1936 Summer Olympics.

References

External links
 

1912 births
1973 deaths
Olympic wrestlers of Germany
Wrestlers at the 1936 Summer Olympics
German male sport wrestlers
Olympic silver medalists for Germany
Olympic medalists in wrestling
Medalists at the 1936 Summer Olympics
People from Pirmasens
Sportspeople from Rhineland-Palatinate
20th-century German people